Doron Leidner (born 26 April 2002) is an Israeli professional footballer who plays as a left-back for Austrian Bundesliga club Austria Wien, on loan from Olympiacos, and the Israel national team.

Early life
Leidner was born and raised in Rishon LeZion, Israel, to a family of Ashkenazi Jewish (Romanian-Jewish) descent.

He also holds a Romanian passport, which eases the move to certain European football leagues.

International career
He also plays for Israel's U-21 since 2021.

Leidner was first called-up to the Israeli senior side on 5 November 2021. His made his senior debut with the Israel national team on 2 June 2022, opening in a 2022–23 UEFA Nations League match against Iceland that ended in a 2–2 home draw, where Leidner assisted the second equalizing goal in the 84th minute.

Career statistics

Club

International

See also 
 List of Jewish footballers
 List of Jews in sports
 List of Israelis

References

External links
 
 
 Doron Leidner at PlaymakerStats.com
 
 Doron Leidner – Israel Football Association national team player details

2002 births
Footballers from Rishon LeZion
Israeli people of Romanian-Jewish descent
Israeli Jews
Israeli Ashkenazi Jews
Living people
Israeli footballers
Jewish footballers
Israel youth international footballers
Israel international footballers
Association football defenders
Hapoel Tel Aviv F.C. players
Olympiacos F.C. players
FK Austria Wien players
Israeli Premier League players
Super League Greece 2 players
Israeli expatriate footballers
Expatriate footballers in Greece
Israeli expatriate sportspeople in Greece
Expatriate footballers in Austria
Israeli expatriate sportspeople in Austria